The Royal Scots Club Edinburgh is a private members' club located at 29-31 Abercromby Street, Edinburgh, EH3 6QE Scotland.

History
Originally formed in 1921 by Lord Henry Scott after World War I for all ranks of the Royal Scots (absorbed into the Royal Regiment of Scotland in 2006) to commemorate the 11,162 Royal Scots who had been killed in the war. Originally a military club it is now open to wider membership, with preferential membership rates for military and ex-military personnel.

Organisation
The club currently has over 2000 members. The current Chairman of Trustees is Major General Mark Strudwick CBE and the Board of Directors is chaired by Mr Shields Henderson. The Club Committee is chaired by Col Clinton Hicks.

Notable events
In 2019 the club honoured the Irish soldier and Royal Scot Joseph Prosser VC a hero of the Crimean War. The club is used as a venue for plays during the Edinburgh Festival Fringe.

See also
 Scottish Arts Club
 The New Club

References

External links 
 Official website

Gentlemen's clubs in Scotland
Clubs and societies in Edinburgh